Cut the Crap is a rock album released in 1997 by Southern Rock band Jackyl and is their 3rd studio album.

Track listing
Songs written by Jesse James Dupree unless noted.

 "Dumb Ass Country Boy" – 2:49
 "Locked and Loaded" (Dupree, Brian Johnson)
features Brian Johnson of AC/DC on vocals – 3:29
 "Open Up" (Dupree, Dion Murdock) – 3:33
 "Misery Loves Company" (Dupree, John Hayes) – 3:46
 "Lets Don't Go There" (Dupree, Hayes) – 3:24
 "Cut the Crap" – 2:04
 "Twice as Ugly" (Dupree, Jeff Worley) – 4:09
 "God Strike Me Dead" – 3:35
 "Thanks For the Grammy" – 3:21
 "Speak of the Devil" – 4:40 (Dupree, Dupree)
 "Push Pull" – 3:55

Personnel
Jesse James Dupree - vocals
Jimmy Stiff - guitars
Jeff Worley - Guitars
Tom Bettini - Bass
Chris Worley - drums
Brian Johnson - vocals on "Locked & Loaded"
Tony Adams - Percussion
Produced, Engineered and Mixed by Mike Fraser

References

1997 albums
Jackyl albums
Epic Records albums